Robert Donaldson may refer to:
 Robert Donaldson (political scientist) (born 1943), American political scientist and president of the University of Tulsa
 Robert Donaldson (politician) (1851–1936), member of the New South Wales Legislative Assembly
 Robert Donaldson Jr. (1800–1872), American banker and patron of the arts
 Bob Donaldson (1868–1947), Scottish footballer